Kingston Water Aerodrome  is located in Collins Bay of Lake Ontario,  west northwest of Kingston, Ontario, Canada.

See also

Kingston Norman Rogers Airport

References

Registered aerodromes in Ontario
Seaplane bases in Ontario
Transport in Kingston, Ontario